The 2014 ITS Cup was a professional tennis tournament played on outdoor clay courts. It was the sixth edition of the tournament which was part of the 2014 ITF Women's Circuit, offering a total of $50,000 in prize money. It took place in Olomouc, Czech Republic, on 14–20 July 2014.

Singles main draw entrants

Seeds 

 1 Rankings as of 7 July 2014

Other entrants 
The following players received wildcards into the singles main draw:
  Barbora Krejčíková
  Maria Marfutina
  Barbora Štefková
  Caroline Übelhör

The following players received entry from the qualifying draw:
  Martina Borecká
  Petra Krejsová
  Lara Michel
  Zuzana Zálabská

The following player received entry into the singles main draw as a lucky loser:
  Lidziya Marozava

Champions

Singles 

  Petra Cetkovská def.  Denisa Allertová 3–6, 6–1, 6–4

Doubles 

  Petra Cetkovská /  Renata Voráčová def.  Barbora Krejčíková /  Aleksandra Krunić 6–2, 4–6, [10–7]

External links 
 2014 ITS Cup at ITFtennis.com
  

Olomouc
ITS Cup
2014 in Czech tennis
2014 in Czech women's sport